The Frederick Hastings Rindge House is a historic house located in the West Adams district of Los Angeles, in Los Angeles County, California.

The Rindge House was built in 1904 for Frederick H. Rindge and wife Rhoda May Knight Rindge and designed by Frederick Louis Roehrig and E.C. Shipley in a Renaissance Revival-Romanesque Revival Victorian style.

In 1986, the Rindge House was listed on the National Register of Historic Places based on architectural criteria.

Rindge Ranch

In 1892 Frederick H. Rindge purchased the  Spanish land grant Rancho Topanga Malibu Sequit or "Malibu Rancho". He later expanded it to ) as the Rindge Ranch, which encompasses present day Malibu, California, and Rhoda May ran it, its oil derrick, and railroad after Frederick's death, also founding the Rindge Dam, Malibu Potteries, and what became Serra Retreat.

See also
 Adamson House
Rindge Dam
Malibu Potteries
Rindge Co. v. County of Los Angeles 262 U.S. 700 (1923)
 List of Los Angeles Historic-Cultural Monuments in South Los Angeles
 List of Registered Historic Places in Los Angeles
Hueneme, Malibu and Port Los Angeles Railway (The railroad that the Rindges built through Malibu)

References

Further reading

Los Angeles Historic-Cultural Monuments
Houses on the National Register of Historic Places in Los Angeles
West Adams, Los Angeles
Houses completed in 1902
Romanesque Revival architecture in California
Victorian architecture in California